Kachikattsy (Xaçıkaat) is a rural locality (a selo) and the administrative center of Kachikatsky Rural Okrug in Khangalassky District of the Sakha Republic, Russia,  from Pokrovsk, the administrative center of the district. Its population as of the 2002 Census was 1,184.

References

Notes

Sources
Official website of the Sakha Republic. Registry of the Administrative-Territorial Divisions of the Sakha Republic. Khangalassky District. 

Rural localities in Khangalassky District